is a drama that aired on Fuji TV. It first aired in Japan from April 15, 2002 to June 24, 2002 every Wednesday. It features music by Elvis Costello (SMILE - main theme song).

Cast
Kimura Takuya as Katase Ryo
Akashiya Sanma as Dojima Kanzo 
Fukatsu Eri as Dojima Yuko
Igawa Haruka as Nishihara Miwa  
Shibasaki Kou as Miyashita Yuki
Tayama Ryosei as Osawa Takashi 
Hanmi Kazuaki as Hnazawa 
Morishita Aiko as Sugita Kotoko

Synopsis
This dark mystery drama written by Eriko Kitagawa is not the usual fare of romantic love comedy that you might expect from the screenwriter who also penned Beautiful Life and Orange Days. Katase Ryo (Kimura) is working as a chef at a pricey restaurant and is a womanizer. Women are only accessories and if he tires of them, he gets rid of them in any way possible. When a presumed suicide turns out to be murder, detective Dojima Kanzo (Sanma) crosses paths with Katase. A cat and mouse game starts with Katase raising the stakes when Dojima's little sister falls for him and Kanzo is determined to save his sister no matter the consequences. As the story continues, a dark past in Kanzo's life also start to rise and open an unimaginable connection between him, his sister, and Katase Ryo. This drama is arguably one of Kimura Takuya's best appearances.

Remake
A South Korean remake of the series titled The Smile Has Left Your Eyes  (Hangul: 하늘에서 내리는 일억개의 별; Hanja: Haneureseo Naerineun Ireokgaeui Byeol; lit. Hundred Million Stars From the Sky) is on air in Tvn channel from 3 October 2018.

References

External links
Sora Kara Furu Ichioku no Hoshi at Japanese Dorama Database
Review at scottishlass.livejournal.com

2002 Japanese television series debuts
2002 Japanese television series endings
Japanese drama television series
Fuji TV dramas